Mesopsocus duboscqui is a species of Psocoptera from the Mesopsocidae family that can be found in Cyprus, France, Greece, Italy, Slovenia, and Spain.

References

Mesopsocidae
Insects described in 1938
Psocoptera of Europe